Sandepudi is a village in Guntur district of the Indian state of Andhra Pradesh. It is located in Edlapadu mandal of Narasaraopet revenue division. It forms a part of Andhra Pradesh Capital Region.

Geography 

Demographics 

 Census of India, Sandepudi had a population of 1,642. The total population constitutes 825 males and 817 females —a sex ratio of 990 females per 1000 males. 111 children are in the age group of 0–6 years, of which 65 are boys and 46 are girls. The average literacy rate stands at 70.89% with 10,001 literates.

Governance 
Sandepudi gram panchayat is the local self-government of the village. It is divided into wards and each ward is represented by a ward member.

Education 

As per the school information report for the academic year 2018–19, the village has a total of 2 Zilla Parishad/Mandal Parishad school.

See also 
List of villages in Guntur district

References 

Villages in Guntur district